Tom Ailes is an English professional rugby union player who plays for Gloucester and Gloucester U20. He is currently playing for Sale F.C.

References

1992 births
Living people
English rugby union players
Gloucester Rugby players
Rugby union players from Manchester
Sale Sharks players
Rugby union number eights